Rokita is a Polish surname.

Rokita may also refer to:
 Rokita, West Pomeranian Voivodeship, a settlement in Poland
 , a village in Ukraine
 Rokita (folklore), a devil in Polish folklore

See also
Rakita (disambiguation)